Zuze Tichaona Chipunza (born 8 June 1994) is a Zimbabwean international footballer who plays for Chicken Inn, as a defender.

Club career
Chipunza began his career in 2013 with Triangle United. After three seasons with the club, Chipunza signed for Dynamos. Ahead of the 2018 Zimbabwe Premier Soccer League, Chipunza signed for Ngezi Platinum, following the expiry of his contract with Dynamos, after making 33 league starts in the previous campaign. For the 2019 Zimbabwe Premier Soccer League season, Chipunza signed for Chicken Inn.

International career
Chipunza made two appearances for Zimbabwe U23 at the 2015 African Games. On 17 May 2015, Chipunza made his international debut for Zimbabwe in a 2–0 win against Mauritius at the 2015 COSAFA Cup.

References

1994 births
Living people
Sportspeople from Masvingo
Zimbabwean footballers
Association football defenders
Zimbabwe international footballers
Dynamos F.C. players
Chicken Inn F.C. players
Ngezi Platinum F.C. players